You is the English second-person pronoun.

You may also refer to:

Geography
 You County, in Hunan Province, China
 You River (Guangxi), a tributary of the Pearl River, China
 You River (Yuan River tributary), in the Wuling Mountains, China

People 
 You (surname), several Chinese family names
 Yabby You (1946–2010), Jamaican reggae musician
 You (Janne Da Arc), or Yutaka Tsuda (born 1974), member of Janne Da Arc
 You (actress) (born 1964), Japanese actress and singer
 You Chung Hong (1898–1977), American attorney and community leader
 You Benchang (born 1933), Chinese actor
 You Bo, Khmer writer and the president of the Khmer Writers' Association
 You Bong-hyung (born 1970), South Korean fencer
 You Ching (born 1942), Republic of China (Taiwan) representative to Germany
 You Shiina, Japanese illustrator and manga artist
 Yuji Adachi (1964–2020), also known as You, Japanese musician

Fictional characters
 You Watanabe, character from the media-mix project Love Live! Sunshine!!
 You Yamane, character from the video game Inazuma Eleven

Books and magazines
 You (Grossman novel),  a 2013 novel by Austin Grossman
 You (Kepnes novel), a 2014 thriller novel by Caroline Kepnes

 You (British magazine), a women's section in the Mail On Sunday newspaper
 You (Japanese magazine), a josei manga magazine
 Young You, a spin-off aimed at young women
 You (South African magazine), a multi-ethnic family magazine
 You (Time Person of the Year), Time magazine's 2006 honoring of user-generated content

Film and TV
 You (1963 film), short by István Szabó
 You (2007 film), 2007 Canadian drama directed by François Delisle
 You (2009 film), 2009 feature film directed by and starring Melora Hardin
 You (TV series), a 2018 American drama based on the Kepnes novel

Music

Albums
 You (Aretha Franklin album) or the title song, 1975
 You (Bang Gang album), 1998
 You (Gong album), 1974
 You (James Arthur album) or the title song (see below), 2019
 You (Juju album) or the title song, 2011
 You (Kate Havnevik album), 2011
 You (Phillip LaRue album) or the title song, 2015
 You (Tuxedomoon album) or the title song, 1987
 Y-O-U (album), by Y-O-U, 2003
 You, by Ali Gatie, 2019
 You, by Bob Snider, 1989
 You, by the Kolors, 2017
 You (Being My Body Whole), by Von Hemmling, 2008
 You, an EP by Dodie Clark, or the title song, 2017

Songs
 "You" (Ayumi Hamasaki song), 1998
 "You" (Benny Blanco, Marshmello and Vance Joy song), 2021
 "You" (Candlebox song), 1993
 "You" (Chris Young song), 2011
 "You" (Earth, Wind & Fire song), 1980
 "You" (Galantis song), 2013
 "You" (George Harrison song), 1975
 "You" (James Arthur song), 2019
 "You" (Janet Jackson song), 1998
 "You" (Jesse Powell song), 1999
 "You" (Kaela Kimura song), 2006
 "You" (Keyshia Cole song), 2017
 "You" (Koda Kumi song), 2005
 "You" (La Cream song), 1998
 "You" (Lloyd song), 2006
 "You" (Marcia Hines song), 1977; written and first recorded by Tom Snow (1975), covered by Rita Coolidge (1978)
 "You" (Marvin Gaye song), 1968
 "You" (Nathaniel Willemse song), 2013
 "You" (Pandora song), 2003
 "You" (Queensrÿche song), 1997
 "You" (Regard, Troye Sivan and Tate McRae song), 2021
 "You" (Robin Stjernberg song), the Sweden entry in the Eurovision Song Contest 2013
 "You" (Romeo Santos song), 2011
 "You" (S Club 7 song), 2002
 "You" (Schiller and Colbie Caillat song), 2008
 "You" (Shaznay Lewis song), 2004
 "You" (Special D. song), 2004
 "You" (Staxx song), 1993
 "You" (Tarot song), 2006
 "You" (Ten Sharp song), 1991
 "You" (Vasil Garvanliev song), 2020
 "You" (Wes Carr song), 2008
 "You" (The Who song), 1981
 "You (Ha Ha Ha)", by Charli XCX, 2013
 "You", by the 1975 from Sex, 2012
 "You", by A Loss for Words, 2011
 "You", by the Afters from I Wish We All Could Win, 2005
 "You", by America from Holiday, 1974
 "You", by Anthem from Black Empire, 2008
 "You", by the Aquatones, 1958
 "You", by Avail from Front Porch Stories, 2002
 "You", by Bad Religion from No Control, 1989
 "You.", by Band-Maid from Just Bring It, 2017
 "You", by Bic Runga from Drive, 1995
 "You", by Bonnie Raitt from Longing in Their Hearts, 1994
 "You", by Breaking Benjamin from Phobia, 2006
 "You", by Brian McKnight from I Remember You, 1995
 "You", by Chris Brown from Exclusive, 2007
 "You", by Collective Soul from Collective Soul, 2009
 "You", by Delta 5 from Singles & Sessions 1979–1981, 2006
 "You", by Diana Ross from Last Time I Saw Him, 1973
 "You", by Ed Sheeran from No. 5 Collaborations Project, 2011
 "You", by Elijah Woods x Jamie Fine, 2019
 "You", by Five Finger Death Punch from The Wrong Side of Heaven and the Righteous Side of Hell, Volume 1, 2013
 "You", by Gold Panda from Lucky Shiner, 2010
 "You", by Gotthard from Open, 1998
 "Y.O.U.", by Grand Funk Railroad from Grand Funk Lives, 1981
 "You", by the Housemartins from London 0 Hull 4, 1986
 "You", by IU from Pieces, 2021
 "You", by Jacquees from 4275, 2018
 "You", by Janelle Monáe from The Audition, 2003
 "You", by Jermaine Dolly, single 2015, on the album Dolly Express, 2017
 "You", by Joanne from Do Not Disturb, 2001
 "You", by Kutless from To Know That You're Alive, 2008
 "You", by Lost Kings, 2015
 "You", by Lucy Pearl from Lucy Pearl, 2000
 "You", by Marina from Love + Fear, 2019
 "You", by Marshall Dyllon from Enjoy the Ride, 2000
 "You", by Monifah from Moods...Moments, 1996
 "You", by Mustard Plug from Evildoers Beware!, 1997
 "You", by Ned's Atomic Dustbin from God Fodder, 1991
 "You", by Plies from The Real Testament, 2007
 "You", by Point Break from Apocadelic, 2000
 "You", by the Pretty Reckless from Light Me Up, 2010
 "You", by Radiohead from Pablo Honey, 1993
 "You", by Raheem DeVaughn from The Love Experience, 2005
 "You", by R.E.M. from Monster, 1994
 "You", by Rich the Kid from Boss Man, 2020
 "You", by Sara Evans from certain editions of Born to Fly, 2000
 "You", by Sarina Paris from Sarina Paris, 2001
 "You", by Snoh Aalegra from Ugh, Those Feels Again, 2019
 "You", by the S.O.S. Band from Too, 1981
 "You", by Steve Martin from Rare Bird Alert, 2011
 "You", by Switchfoot from The Legend of Chin, 1997
 "You", by Tally Hall from Good & Evil, 2011
 "You", by T.I. from Dime Trap, 2018
 "You", by Tinashe from Songs for You, 2019
 "You", by Tony Banks from A Curious Feeling, 1979
 "You", by Xiumin, 2019
 "You", by Yoko Ono from Fly, 1971
 "You", by Yolanda Adams, 2009

Other uses
 You (vessel), a type of ancient Chinese bronzeware
 YouTube, an American video sharing website
 You.com, a search engine

See also
 U, the 21st letter and the fifth vowel in the ISO basic Latin alphabet
 U (disambiguation)
 Yew (disambiguation)
 Yoo (disambiguation)
 Yoo (Korean surname)
 Yours (disambiguation)
 Yu (disambiguation)
 Ewe, adult female sheep